The Baise horse (also known as the Guangxi) is a pony-sized horse breed native to the autonomous region of Guangxi, in southeastern China. Like other Asian breeds (the Mongolian horse in particular), it thrives at high altitudes and roams freely when not working. Guangxi's mild climate has long favored horse breeding; bronze statues from the third to the first centuries BCE exist of horses very similar in conformation to the Baise.

Breed characteristics

Its head is heavy, with a straight profile and wide jaw; it has a medium-length neck, running down to straight shoulders. Its legs are strong and well-developed, with strong hooves The usual coat colors are black, chestnut, gray and bay. The Baise is strong and quick with a willing, able temperament. It is used as a riding and pack horse for tourism, on the farm and in harness; it is also used for meat.

Baise horses are an important part of Guangxi village life, and are included in traditional wedding celebrations.

See also 
 Guangxi
 Mongolian horse

References 

Horse breeds originating in China
Horse breeds
Types of horse